BUT, but or But may refer to: 
 but, the adversative conjunction in English

Businesses 
 British United Traction, British railway equipment and trolleybus manufacturer
 BUT (retailer), a French retail store franchise

Education 
 Beijing University of Technology, Beijing, China
 Brno University of Technology, Brno, Czech Republic

Places 
 But, Opole Voivodeship, a village in Poland
 Bathpalathang Airport, Bhutan (by IATA code)
 Butterfly stop, a light-rail stop in Hong Kong (by MTR station code)
 County of Bute, a historic county of Scotland (by Chapman code in genealogy)

Other uses 
 but-, an organic chemical name component
 But (surname), list of people so named
 "BUT"/"Aishō", a 2007 J-Pop song by Koda Kumi

See also
 Butt (disambiguation)
 Butte (disambiguation)
 Butts (disambiguation)